Butterbean may refer to:
 Lima bean Phaseolus lunatus, an edible legume
 Runner bean Phaseolus coccineus, grown both as an edible bean and as an ornamental plant
Lablab known as butter bean in the Caribbean

People 
 Butterbean Love or Bob Love (born 1942), retired American professional basketball player
 Eric Esch (born 1966), American boxer and mixed martial artist, better known by his nickname Butterbean

Other uses 
 "Butterbean", a song from The B-52's 1983 album Whammy!
 Eleanor Butterbean, a character in The Grim Adventures of Billy & Mandy